Bihar is a state in India.

Bihar may also refer to:

Places

India
 Bihar Province, former colonial province in British India
 Bihar Subah, a Bihar-based Mughal imperial province
 Bihar Sharif, headquarters of Nalanda district, Bihar, India
 Bihar River, a border river of Palamu district, Jharkhand, India
 Bihar, Unnao, a village in Uttar Pradesh, India

Elsewhere
 Bihar County, a historic county of the Kingdom of Hungary
 Bihor County (Bihar County in Hungarian), a county of current-day Romania
 Bihar, the Hungarian name for Biharia Commune, Bihor County, Romania

People
 Bihar (king), a khagan of the Khazars

See also 
 Behar, a portion in the annual Jewish cycle of Torah reading
 Bihar al-Anwar, a hadith compilation by Allamah Majlisi
 Bihari (disambiguation)
 Bihor (disambiguation)
 Hajdú-Bihar, a county in Hungary
 Cooch Behar, a district in West Bengal
 Cooch Behar State, a former princely state in India